Farrah N. Khan (born ) is an American politician serving as the 23rd Mayor of Irvine, California. A member of the Democratic Party, Khan first served Irvine as a member of City Council before being elected mayor in 2020.

Early life and education 
Khan was born in Lahore, Pakistan. She immigrated to the United States when she was three years old. She subsequently lived in northern California. She received her bachelor's degree in English literature from the University of California, Davis. She moved to Irvine in 2004.

Career 
Prior to working in politics, Khan worked as a regulatory manager for a biotech company. She has also worked as a small business owner and was executive director of the Newport Mesa Irvine Interfaith Council.

Irvine City Council 
Khan first ran for Irvine City Council unsuccessfully in 2016. Running again in 2018, she was elected. She was the first Muslim and woman of color to be elected to Irvine's city council.

While on the Irvine City Council, she co-introduced an item that repealed a decades-old ordinance that did not offer members of the LGBT community anti-discrimination protections.

Mayor of Irvine 
Khan ran for mayor during the 2020 election. She won about 47% of the vote, unseating mayor pro tem Christina Shea, a Republican, who received 36% of the vote. Khan stated that she felt motivated to run for mayor after Shea made controversial criticisms of Black Lives Matter protestors that Khan felt were "not reflective of our community." Her election as mayor made her not only the first Muslim and woman of color to serve Irvine City Council but also the first Muslim woman to serve as mayor of a large city in the United States.

Khan ran again for mayor in the 2022 election, and won reelection with 37.8% of the vote.

2020 meeting with Ergun Kirlikovali 
In March 2022, a video of a 2020 meeting with Khan and Ergun Kirlikovali surfaced. In the video, Kirlikovali, a former President of the Assembly of Turkish American Associations, appears to make a joke that a box of Turkish delights could be eaten on Armenians' occasions, which would make them disappear. Khan appears to joke along, saying she would make sure to eat the Turkish delights in front of them. Kirlikovali is a known Armenian genocide denier. Some claimed that the joke was about making Armenians disappear whereas Khan has maintained that that was not the case.

This video was met with outrage and criticism, especially by members of the Armenian community. The group ANCA Western Region criticized Khan for associating with a genocide denier and pointed out that Khan appointed Kirlikovali to her mayoral advisory committee in 2021.

In response, Khan claimed that the video was not accurate, stating that the video's captions had an "incorrect translation". Khan also promised to cut ties with deniers of the Armenian genocide.

Texts with Katie Porter 
In October 2022, Khan received scrutiny as to whether she was responsible for leaking texts she had with United States representative Katie Porter. The texts concerned an incident in which Porter held a town hall meeting, at which protestors arrived. Porter expressed in the texts her dissatisfaction with how the Irvine Police Department handled the situation. These texts were later reported on by Fox News. Local Democrats questioned how the media got ahold of the texts. Khan claimed that the texts were requested via a public records request. However, the Irvine City Clerk disputed that, stating that the request was not fulfilled until after the Fox News report.

Possible FBI investigation 
In 2022, Dr. Kathleen Treseder, an Irvine City Council candidate, publicly spoke about an FBI investigation involving Khan. Melahat Rafiei, who has worked as the chief consultant for Khan and was previously arrested by the FBI for bribery, met with Treseder in order to discuss concerns about OC Power Authority CEO Brian Probolsky. (There have been concerns about the OC Power Authority due to transparency issues.) Treseder claims that Rafiei told her that Khan has been protecting Probolsky in exchange for political favors, namely, a California Coastal Commission nomination. Treseder claims that the FBI is investigating this alleged corruption involving Khan, but Khan has maintained that there is no such investigation.

References 

University of California, Davis alumni
Mayors of Irvine, California
Women mayors of places in California
1971 births
Living people